The 2015–16 Pittsburgh Panthers women's basketball team will represent Pittsburgh University during the 2015–16 college basketball season. The Panthers, led by third year head coach Suzie McConnell-Serio. The Panthers, third year members of the Atlantic Coast Conference, will play their home games at the Petersen Events Center. They finished the season 13–18, 4–12 in ACC play to finish in a tie for twelfth place. They advanced to the second round of the ACC women's tournament where they lost to Miami (FL).

2015–16 media

Pitt Panthers Sports Network
The Pitt Panthers Sports Network will broadcast all Panthers games on WJAS. George Von Benko will provide the play-by-play while Jen Tuscano will provide the analysis. Non-televised home games can be watched online via Pitt Panthers TV with the Panthers Sports Network call.

Roster

Schedule

|-
!colspan=9 style="background:#091C44; color:#CEC499;" |Exhibition

|-
!colspan=9 style="background:#091C44; color:#CEC499;"| Non-conference regular season

|-
!colspan=9 style="background:#091C44; color:#CEC499;"| ACC regular season

|-
!colspan=9 style="background:#091C44; color:#CEC499;"| ACC Women's tournament

Rankings

References

Pittsburgh Panthers women's basketball seasons
Pittsburgh